Crataegus maximowiczii is a species of hawthorn with fruit that are red to purple-black.

See also
 List of hawthorn species with black fruit

References

maximowiczii